Dení Ramírez Macías (also known as Dení Ramírez) is a Mexican marine biologist ocean scientist, and conservationist, and director of Whale Shark México (Tiburon Ballena Mexico) since 2003. She leads the "Giants of Peru" project of the Save Our Seas Foundation.

Ecology Project International lists Ramírez among "women scientists who are saving the planet", and "one of the few experts on whale shark genetics in the world"; she helped the Mexican government develop management plans for whale shark tourism and conservation.

Ramírez helped form the nonprofit Hawai‘i Uncharted Research Collective, which she encouraged to collect whale shark sightings in the Hawaii region to help complete the picture of their lives.

Ramírez founded Conexiones TerraMar which promotes science, conservation and education.

Biography 
Dení Ramírez-Macías was born in Mexico city; however, she spent two years in the Netherlands as a baby, returning to Mexico City at the age of three. Dení Ramírez-Macías spent her teens years in Cuernavaca and Tepoztlán. Ramírez fell in love with diving at the early age of 7 while in Chankanab, Cozumel. This experience inspired her to complete a Doctor of Science in Biology specializing in whale shark population genetics.

Career 
Prior to her academic career, Ramírez created a non-profit organization that focused on environmental education, ConCiencia Mexico, with a group of friends. This NGO was initially inspired by Ramírez and her friends while cleaning beaches. This mentality of environmental education inspired Ramírez to pursue a career in academics, specifically marine biology. She continued her career in academics by focusing on her love for the ocean which brought her to work with large marine species such as whale sharks and manta rays. Ramírez has received grants from organizations such as WWF, Save our Seas Foundation, and Rufford foundation to fund her research. Dení Ramírez-Macías completed her Bachelor of Science degree in Marine Biology at University of La Paz, Mexico, her Master of Science with Honours in Marine Science through the Interdisciplinary Center of Marine Sciences in La Paz, Mexico and her Doctor of Science in Biology through the Northwest Biology Research Centre in La Paz Mexico. Her research has allowed her to travel to the Gulf of California to complete the first study in the world on whale shark population genetics. The field work for her PhD was completed in the Philippines where she collaborated with whale shark experts around the world investigating the whale shark population structure and abundance in the Gulf of California and Holbox Island. Her research continues to focus on the migratory patterns of whale sharks in the Gulf of California and surrounding areas, whale shark behaviour and contaminants. Ramírez has become a whale shark expert, like those she worked with in her PhD. She is now the Director of Whale Shark Mexico and has been active on the scientific committee for the last 2 International Whale Shark Conference in Australia. Additionally, she has been advising for whale sharks projects in Honduras, Hawaii and Venezuela. In 2016 she commenced a project in Peru working with EcOceanica, a Peruvian NGO, in addition to Save our Seas Foundation, to conserve whale sharks and their habitat. Her team is composed solely of females with a passion for marine animals and conservation. Recently, she founded a second non-profit organization, Conexiones TerraMar which promotes science, conservation and education.

Dení Ramírez-Macías’ passion extends beyond whale sharks into manta rays, which she has been studying in Archipelago of Revillagigedo since 2006. She performed ultrasounds to observe the pregnancy of the mantas in Ecuador in collaboration with Marine Megafauna Foundation of Ecuador and on Mobula munkiana from Isla Espiritu Santo in collaboration with Pelagios Kakunjá. Ramírez-Macías’s research has also been used in conservation of other marine species in addition to the creation of protected areas for whale sharks and their management.Ramírez helped form the nonprofit Hawai‘i Uncharted Research Collective, which she encouraged to collect whale shark sightings in the Hawaii region to help complete the picture of their lives.

Awards

Projects

Research Stays Abroad

Students Supervised

Scholarships

Publications

Journal articles

Books

References

Living people
Mexican marine biologists
Mexican women scientists
Women marine biologists
1978 births
Scientists from Mexico City